Half Assini, also known as Awiane, is a small town and is the capital of Jomoro Municipal District, a municipality in the Western Region of Ghana. It is the hometown of Kwame Nkrumah's father. Nkrumah, the first president of Ghana, had attended elementary school at Half Assini. The town in closer to the western border of Ghana, and is known for its numerous tourist sites. One of Half Assini's chiefs, Anthony Kwaw, was best friends with Ghana's first president in school.

See also
Half Assini - New Town Rd.
Half Assini - Mpataba Rd.

References

Populated places in Jomoro Municipal District